Hoon-Yung Hopgood (born December 8, 1974) is a former member of the Michigan State Senate, representing the 6th district (formerly numbered as the 8th district) from 2011 until 2018. He is a Democrat and a former member of the Michigan State House of Representatives. He represented roughly half of the cities which make up the Downriver area of Metro Detroit, as well as other cities in Wayne County. He is the first Korean American to hold state office in Michigan.

Early life 
Hopgood was born in Incheon, South Korea, in 1974, and was adopted in 1976 by Diane Hopgood, former principal at Johnson Elementary in Taylor, Michigan, and the late Rollie Hopgood, who was president of the Michigan Federation of Teachers and School Related Personnel. He received his bachelor's degree from the University of Michigan in 1996. In 2002 he became an aide to former State Representative Ray Basham.

Political career 
Hopgood was elected to the Michigan House of Representatives in 2002, representing the 22nd District, which includes the cities of Romulus, Michigan and Taylor. He has become a leader on educational issues in the state. He was a member of the Children's Caucus, a board member of the Michigan Youth in Government, and a member of the House Democratic Task Force on Early Education and Care. He is on the Steering Committee for the Michigan Coalition on Civic Education, and was part of the Michigan delegation to the Congressional Conference on Civic Education in Washington, D.C.

In his final term, Hopgood served on six committees in the House of Representatives: Transportation - Chair, Education, Subcommittee on High School Graduation - Chair, Energy and Technology, Labor, and Senior Health and Retirement.

After serving three terms in the House of Representatives, Hopgood was term limited and was ineligible to serve again.

In 2010 Hopgood was elected to the Michigan Senate, where he served on the Senate Education Committee, Energy and Technology Committee, and Appropriations Committee. He resides in Taylor.

Electoral history

References

External links 
 Biography

1974 births
American politicians of Korean descent
South Korean emigrants to the United States
Asian-American people in Michigan politics
Living people
Members of the Michigan House of Representatives
Michigan state senators
American adoptees
South Korean adoptees
University of Michigan alumni
21st-century American politicians
People from Incheon